Mount Petinos is a mountain (500 m) located 1 nautical mile (1.9 km) east-southeast of Worley Point in the northwest part of Shepard Island off the coast of Marie Byrd Land, Antarctica. It was mapped from the USS Glacier on February 4, 1962, and was named for Lieutenant (j.g.) Frank Petinos, U.S. Navy, first lieutenant of the Glacier.

Mountains of Marie Byrd Land